Commonwealth is an English term meaning a political community, usually used in reference to the Commonwealth of Nations.

Commonwealth or Common Wealth may also refer to:

Political entities
See also Places, below
 Commonwealth Government, used to refer to the Australian Government
 Commonwealth of Nations, an intergovernmental organisation of 56 member states comprising mostly former British colonies; formerly called British Commonwealth of Nations
 Commonwealth of Independent States, an intergovernmental organisation of Post-Soviet republics
 Lusophone Commonwealth, officially the Community of Portuguese Language Countries, an intergovernmental organisation consisting of former Portuguese colonies
 Commonwealth of England, the republican government ruling England, and later Ireland and Scotland, 1649–1660
 Commonwealth realm, a sovereign state which has Charles III as its monarch and head of state
 Polish–Lithuanian Commonwealth, a constitutional monarchy that ruled Poland, Lithuania and much of Eastern Europe between 1569 and 1795

Arts, entertainment, and media

Literature
 Common Wealth: Economics for a Crowded Planet, a 2004 book by Jeffrey Sachs
 Commonwealth (book), by Michael Hardt and Antonio Negri
 Commonwealth (Goebel novel), a 2008 novel by Joey Goebel
 Commonwealth (Patchett novel), a 2016 novel by Ann Patchett

Music
 "Commonwealth" (song), bootleg song by the Beatles
 Commonwealth (New Grass Revival album), 1981
 Commonwealth (Sloan album)
 "Commonwealth", a song by the American band Bright from the album The Miller Fantasies

Periodical
 Commonwealth Magazine  a web-based publication that covers politics, policy, ideas, and civic life

Other uses
 Commonwealth (statue), a 1905 statue on the Pennsylvania State Capitol grounds
 The Commonwealth (Pittsburgh), a 19th-century newspaper in Pittsburgh, Pennsylvania
 The Commonwealth, a late-19th century publication of the London branch of the Christian Social Union
 The Commonwealth, the official publication of the Commonwealth Club of California

Companies and charities
 Commonwealth (automobile company), a luxury auto company that produced cars from 1917 to 1922
 Commonwealth Aircraft Corporation, a former Australian aircraft manufacturer
 Commonwealth Athletic Conference, a high school athletic conference in Massachusetts
 Commonwealth Bank, an Australian multinational bank
 Commonwealth Brands, a tobacco company now called Commonwealth-Altadis, part of Imperial Tobacco
 Commonwealth Engineering, a former Australian engineering company
 Commonwealth Fund, an American charity promoting health care reform in the United States

Places

United States

 Commonwealth (U.S. insular area), a term used for two current and one former self-governing U.S. territories
 Commonwealth (U.S. state), a term used by four U.S. states in their full official state names, specifically:
 Commonwealth of Massachusetts, the full name of Massachusetts
 Commonwealth of Kentucky, the full name of Kentucky
 Commonwealth of Pennsylvania, the full name of Pennsylvania
 Commonwealth of Virginia, the full name of Virginia
 Commonwealth, Virginia, an unincorporated community
 Commonwealth, Wisconsin, a town
 Commonwealth (community), Wisconsin, an unincorporated community within the town
 Commonwealth Avenue (disambiguation)
 Commonwealth Club Historic District, a private club in Richmond, Virginia

Elsewhere

 Commonwealth, Singapore, a subzone in Singapore
 Commonwealth MRT station, a metro station along the East West Line in Singapore
 Commonwealth Mountain, a mountain on Ellesmere Island, Nunavut, Canada
 Commonwealth of Australia, the full name of Australia
 Commonwealth of the Bahamas, the full name of The Bahamas

Military

 HMAS Commonwealth, a Royal Australian Navy shore base located in Kure, Japan from 1948 to 1956
 HMS Commonwealth (1903), a Royal Navy battleship from 1905 to 1921

Schools

 Commonwealth College (disambiguation), three American colleges
 Commonwealth School, an independent high school in Boston, Massachusetts
 Commonwealth Secondary School, a secondary school in Jurong East, Singapore

See also

 Commonweal (disambiguation)
 Commonwealth Bank building (disambiguation)
 Commonwealth Brigade (disambiguation)
 Commonwealth Building (disambiguation)
 Commonwealth Club (disambiguation)
 Co-operative Commonwealth (disambiguation)
 Commonwealth Conference (disambiguation)
 Commonwealth District (disambiguation)